Gaius Livius Salinator, son of Marcus, was a Roman consul of the gens Livia, said to have founded the city of Forum Livii (Forlì), in Italy, during his consulship in the year 188 BC. He also served as admiral when he was praetor in 191 BC in the war against Antiochus III the Great and defeated his admiral, Polyxenidas, in the Battle of Corycus

2nd-century BC Roman consuls
Roman Republican praetors
Salinator, Gaius
Ancient Roman admirals